Sahray-e Bid (also Romanized as Şaḩrāy-e Bīd; also known as Şaḩrā-ye Bīd) is a village in Javid-e Mahuri Rural District, in the Central District of Mamasani County, Fars Province, Iran. At the 2006 census, its population was 82, in 21 families.

References 

Populated places in Mamasani County